Sergey Vladimirovich Surovikin (Russian: Серге́й Влади́мирович Сурови́кин; born 11 October 1966) is a Russian Armed Forces army general and Commander of the Aerospace Forces. A veteran of the Soviet–Afghan War, Tajikistani Civil War, Second Chechen War, and the Russian military intervention in the Syrian Civil War, he was from October 2022 to January 2023 the commander of all Russian forces in the Russian invasion of Ukraine that started in February 2022.

During the 1991 Soviet coup d'état attempt, Surovikin commanded a unit that killed three anti-coup demonstrators, for which he was detained for several months but never convicted. He played an important role in the creation of the Main Directorate of the Military Police, a new organisation within the Russian Army. Surovikin commanded the Eastern Military District between 2013 and 2017, and in 2017 commanded the Russian group of forces in Syria. He is accredited with turning the tide of the war in Syrian president Bashar al-Assad's favour, and is also alleged to have been responsible for strikes on civilian targets during the Russian intervention.

During the 2022 Russian invasion of Ukraine, Surovikin was initially the commander of the Army Group "South" of the Russian Armed Forces. On 8 October 2022, he became the commander of all Russian forces invading Ukraine, but was replaced by Valery Gerasimov in January 2023.

Early life and education
Surovikin was born on 11 October 1966 in Novosibirsk. In 1987, he graduated from the Omsk Higher Military Command School.

Military career

Early career and military academy attendance
He was assigned to a spetsnaz unit and served in the Soviet–Afghan War.

By August 1991, he was a captain and commander of the 1st Rifle Battalion in the 2nd Guards Tamanskaya Motor Rifle Division. During the 1991 Soviet coup d'état attempt in Moscow, Surovikin was ordered to send his battalion into the tunnel on the Garden Ring, where three anti-coup demonstrators were killed. After the defeat of the coup, Surovikin was arrested and held under investigation for seven months. The charges were dropped on 10 December because Boris Yeltsin concluded that Surovikin was only following orders. He was promoted to the rank of major afterwards.

Surovikin attended the Frunze Military Academy. In September 1995, he was sentenced to a year of probation by the Moscow garrison's military court for illegally selling weapons. The conviction was overturned after the investigation concluded that Surovikin had agreed to give a fellow student a pistol for use in a competition, unaware of its intended purpose.

In 1995, he graduated from the Frunze Military Academy. Surovikin participated in the Tajikistani Civil War where he commanded a motor rifle battalion. He then became chief of staff of the 92nd Motor Rifle Regiment, chief of staff and commander of the 149th Guards Motor Rifle Regiment and chief of staff of the 201st Motor Rifle Division.

In 2002, he graduated from the Military Academy of the General Staff. He became commander of the 34th Motor Rifle Division at Yekaterinburg.

Suicide of subordinate in Surovikin's presence
In March 2004, Surovikin was accused by Lieutenant Colonel Viktor Chibizov of beating him up for leaving his post to participate in elections as an observer. In April, division deputy commander for armaments Colonel Andrei Shtakal shot himself in the presence of Surovikin and the district deputy commander after being criticized by Surovikin. In both cases, a military prosecutor found no evidence of guilt.

Early command roles

From June 2004, he led the 42nd Guards Motor Rifle Division, stationed in Chechnya.

He was the chief of staff of the 20th Guards Army from 2005. In April 2008, he became the army commander.

In November 2008, Surovikin became head of the Main Operations Directorate of the General Staff. In January 2010, he became chief of staff of the Volga–Urals Military District, which soon became part of the Central Military District.

Military Police
From November 2011, he headed the working group charged with creation of the Military Police. It was reported that Surovikin was tipped to head the Military Police after it was instituted, but the appointment did not materialise due to the intervention of the Russian Military Prosecutor's Office, according to the Russian media, which presented the situation as a turf conflict between the Defence Ministry and the Military Prosecutor's Office. In October 2012, he became the chief of staff of the Eastern Military District. In October 2013, he was appointed commander of the district. On 13 December, Surovikin was promoted to the rank of colonel general.

Syrian civil war

On 9 June 2017, he was introduced to news media representatives as the Commander of the Russian armed forces deployed to Syria. Reportedly, he took this position in March 2017. In September 2017, Surovikin was cited by Russian media as a likely successor to Viktor Bondarev, who was on 26 September relieved of the position of the Commander of the Aerospace Forces. According to a report published by RBK Group on 2 November 2017 that cited an anonymous source in the MoD, Surovikin had been appointed Commander of the Aerospace Forces, despite his initial objections.

At the end of November 2017, the Russian MoD's Krasnaya Zvezda reported that Surovikin had been appointed Commander of the Aerospace Forces by a presidential decree of 22 November. TASS pointed out that Surovikin became the first combined-arms commander in the history of Russia and the Soviet Union to be put in charge of the Russian or Soviet air forces. On 28 December, he was made a Hero of the Russian Federation for his leadership of the Group of Forces in Syria.

Under the command of Surovikin, a significant turning point in the fight against the Syrian opposition was achieved. The Syrian Government regained over 50% control of Syria by the end of 2017 after a string of successful military campaigns. According to several Russian military commentators, it was Surovikin who managed to turn the tide of the war in Syria.

Again from January to April 2019, Surovikin took over as the commander of the contingent of Russian military forces in Syria. Altogether he commanded the Russian forces group in Syria for more than a year, which was longer than any other officer who held this position until November 2020, when Lieutenant General Aleksandr Chaiko surpassed his duration in that post.

In 2021, Surovikin was promoted to General of the Army. As one of only a handful of Russian officers to reach such a rank, prompting speculation that he might be an eventual successor to Valery Gerasimov as Chief of the General Staff.

Russian invasion of Ukraine

In June 2022, it was revealed that he became the commander of the Army Group "South" of the Russian Armed Forces in the Southern Ukraine campaign. On 8 October, it was announced that he will be commander of all Russian forces in Ukraine, succeeding Colonel General Gennady Zhidko. On 18 October Surovikin was reported as saying that "The situation in the area of the 'Special Military Operation' can be described as tense".

On 18 October 2022, he said in an interview with Russian media that "Our opponent is a criminal regime, while we and the Ukrainians are one people and want the same thing: for Ukraine to be a country that’s friendly to Russia and independent from the West".

According to sources close to the Kremlin, Surovikin is a proponent of large-scale attacks on civilian and critical infrastructure.

On 9 November 2022, in a televised meeting with Russian defence minister Sergei Shoigu, Surovikin, made a public statement on Russian media—along with other military staff—recommending a withdrawal of Russian forces from Kherson in order to save Russian troops who faced being trapped. In the same TV appearance, Shoigu approved the withdrawal.

On 11 January 2023 Surovikin was replaced as commander of all Russian forces in Ukraine by Valery Gerasimov, becoming one of Gerasimov's deputies.

Sanctions 
In February 2022, Surovikin was added to the European Union sanctions list for being "responsible for actively supporting and implementing actions and policies that undermine and threaten the territorial integrity, sovereignty and independence of Ukraine as well as the stability or security in Ukraine".

Awards 
Surovikin has been awarded the Order of the Red Star, the Order of Military Merit and the Order of Courage three times. He was awarded the Hero of the Russian Federation in December 2017. On 31 December 2022 President Vladimir Putin personally awarded Surovikin the Order of St. George third class.

Incarceration and accusations of human rights abuses 
Surovikin is accused of having ordered troops to open fire on pro-democracy protestors in Moscow, during the 1991 Soviet coup d'état attempt, when three people were killed. Surovikin was jailed for six months but was later released without trial by order of President Boris Yeltsin. In 1995, Surovikin was found guilty of illegal arms trade. He was sentenced but later let off following allegations that he had been framed.

An October 2020 Human Rights Watch report listed Surovikin as one of the commanders "who may bear command responsibility for violations" during the 2019–2020 offensive in Idlib, Syria.

Personal life 
He is married and has four children. Surovikin is an Orthodox Christian.

References

External links 
 

1966 births
Living people
Military personnel from Novosibirsk
Frunze Military Academy alumni
Military Academy of the General Staff of the Armed Forces of Russia alumni
Heroes of the Russian Federation
Recipients of the Medal of the Order "For Merit to the Fatherland" I class
Recipients of the Medal of the Order "For Merit to the Fatherland" II class
Recipients of the Order of Courage
Recipients of the Order of Military Merit (Russia)
Generals of the army (Russia)
People of the 1991 Soviet coup d'état attempt
Russian military personnel of the 2022 Russian invasion of Ukraine
Russian military personnel of the Syrian civil war
Russian Orthodox Christians from Russia
Soviet Army officers
Anti-Ukrainian sentiment in Russia